Nazar Abbas Naqvi is Elected Second Time Pradan for Village Bhadari and a Bharatiya Janata Party leader. Born in Allahabad in 3 Jan 1965. He is Allahabad District President of BJP (Minority Wing).
He is President of Pradhan Sangh Allahabad.

External links
 Nazar Abbas Naqvi
 Photos of Nazar Abbas Naqvi
 News About Nazar Abbas Naqvi

Politicians from Allahabad
Indian Shia Muslims
1965 births
Bharatiya Janata Party politicians from Uttar Pradesh
Living people